Cedar Glen, California is an unincorporated community in located in the San Bernardino National Forest resort area of San Bernardino County immediately east of Lake Arrowhead.

The community lies at an elevation of 5403 ft (1647 m).

The town's ZIP Code is 92321 and it lies entirely within area code 909.  The nearest highway is California State Highway 173 which bisects Cedar Glen and passes through Lake Arrowhead.

Demographics
As of the census of 2000, there were 552 people and 590 housing units.  The racial makeup of the CDP was 86.6% White, <0.1% African American, <0.1% Native American, 9.2% Asian, 4.2% Pacific Islander, <0.1% from other races, and <0.1% from two or more races. Hispanic or Latino of any race were <0.1% of the population.

Comedian Jon Dore resides in Cedar Glen.

Education
Cedar Glen is served by the Rim of the World Unified School District.

Government

Weather
Cedar Glen has a roughly Mediterranean climate.

References

Unincorporated communities in San Bernardino County, California
Unincorporated communities in California